The Holy Family with Saint Joachim and Saint Anne Before the Eternal Glory or The Three Generations is a 1769 painting by Francisco Goya. It is now in the Marquis de las Palmas collection in Jerez de la Frontera. It shows the Holy Family, with the Virgin Mary's parents saint Anne and saint Joachim and God the Father and the Holy Spirit.

See also
List of works by Francisco Goya

External links
  Catalogue page - University of Saragossa
  José Manuel Arnaiz (1996), «La Triple Génération».

Paintings by Francisco Goya
1769 paintings
Goya